Patrick Murphy (Q1 1882 – Q2 1938) was an Irish first-class cricketer.

Murphy was born at County Wicklow in the 1st quarter of 1882. Playing club cricket for Civil Service (Dublin), Murphy made two appearances in first-class cricket for Ireland. The first of these came against Scotland at Perth in 1909, while the second of these came against the same opposition at Dublin in 1912. Across his two matches, he scored 26 runs with a high score of 10. With his medium pace he took 4 wickets, with best innings figures of 2/92. His work as a civil servant limited any future appearances. He died at Dublin in the 2nd quarter of 1938.

References

External links

1882 births
1938 deaths
People from County Wicklow
Irish cricketers
Irish civil servants